The Yale English Monarchs series is a series of biographies on English and British kings and queens, published by Yale University Press. The books are written by some of the leading experts within their respective fields, incorporating the latest historical research. Several books in the English Monarchs series have previously also been published by the University of California Press, though the series is today in the hands of Yale University Press. 

The following table shows books published or forthcoming. Unless otherwise stated, the given regnal name also makes up the book title. The date given is the original publishing date of each book. Titles published by the University of California Press are in italics. Included in the list are also intervening monarchs on whom no books have been published yet.

References

External links
Series web page at Yale University Press.
British site

Book series introduced in 1964
Series of history books
History books about England
Yale University Press books